Triisopropylphosphine is the tertiary phosphine with the formula P(CH(CH3)2)3.  Commonly used as a ligand in organometallic chemistry, it is often abbreviated to Pi-Pr3 or PiPr3.  This ligand is one of the most basic alkyl phosphines with a large ligand cone angle of 160.

Pi-Pr3 is similar to the more frequently used tricyclohexylphosphine. The triisopropyl derivative however, is a liquid at room temperature and more soluble in hydrocarbons.

References

Tertiary phosphines
Isopropyl compounds